The Prince George Railway & Forestry Museum is in Prince George, British Columbia.  Its collection consists of over sixty pieces of rolling stock (including a 1906 steam locomotive being restored and a GMD GF6C electric locomotive), ten historical buildings and numerous smaller artifacts on an  site.  The Museum opened on July 20, 1986.

See also
List of heritage railways in Canada
Canadian Pacific Railway 
List of heritage railways in Canada

References

Railway museums in British Columbia
Forestry museums in Canada
Buildings and structures in Prince George, British Columbia